Jorge Kalume (3 December 1920 – 26 October 2010) was a Brazilian politician.

Jorge Kalume was born on 3 December 1920 in Belém, a city in the Brazilian Amazon. He was governor of Acre from 1966 to 1971, during the military regime.
He served as senator for Acre from 1979 to 1987.

He died of bowel cancer in Brasília on 26 October 2010.

See also
 List of mayors of Rio Branco, Acre

References 

Members of the Federal Senate (Brazil)
People from Belém
1920 births
2010 deaths
Governors of Acre (state)
Deaths from colorectal cancer
Deaths from cancer in Federal District (Brazil)